Dr. Steven's House at 21 S. Riverview Heights in Sioux Falls, South Dakota, was built in 1926 for local physician George Stevens and his wife Nelle. It is located directly facing the Sioux Falls Veteran's Hospital.

The Italian Renaissance architectural style home was designed by local architect Robert Perkins, of Perkins and McWayne. This particular style of architecture was popular in the United States during the late 19th century-early 20th century.

It was listed on the National Register of Historic Places in Minnehaha County, South Dakota in 2002.

References

National Register of Historic Places in Sioux Falls, South Dakota
1926 establishments in South Dakota